Amélie Mauresmo defeated Mary Pierce in the final, 5–7, 7–6(7–3), 6–4 to win the singles tennis title at the 2005 WTA Tour Championships.

Maria Sharapova was the defending champion, but lost in the semifinals to Mauresmo.

Seeds

Note:
  Justine Henin-Hardenne had qualified but pulled out due a hamstring injury.

Alternates

Draw

Finals

Black group

Standings are determined by: 1. number of wins; 2. number of matches; 3. in two-players-ties, head-to-head records; 4. in three-players-ties, percentage of sets won, or of games won; 5. steering-committee decision.

Green group

Standings are determined by: 1. number of wins; 2. number of matches; 3. in two-players-ties, head-to-head records; 4. in three-players-ties, percentage of sets won, or of games won; 5. steering-committee decision.

See also
WTA Tour Championships appearances

References

Singles 2005
2005 WTA Tour